The Domino Effect is a BBC Books original novel written by David Bishop and based on the long-running British science fiction television series Doctor Who. It features the Eighth Doctor, Fitz, Anji and Trix.

Reception 

The Domino Effect won Worst Book in the 2003 Jade Pagoda Awards.
Author David Bishop himself conceded that the results of the book was not what he intended and that it was not one of the best books that he has written.

References

External links
The Cloister Library - The Domino Effect

2003 British novels
2003 science fiction novels
Eighth Doctor Adventures
Novels by David Bishop